The 1993 UK Athletics Championships was the national championship in outdoor track and field for the United Kingdom held at Crystal Palace Athletics Stadium, London. It was the second time that the British capital hosted the event, having previously done so in 1980. It would be the last outing of the series in its annual format.

The event programme was expanded to reincorporate men's and women's racewalking events (held separately at Bedford International Stadium), as well as the UK championship debut of both pole vault and hammer throw for women. The women's 3000 m race was dropped, however.

It was the seventeenth edition of the competition limited to British athletes only, launched as an alternative to the AAA Championships, which was open to foreign competitors. However, due to the fact that the calibre of national competition remained greater at the AAA event, the UK Championships this year were not considered the principal national championship event by some statisticians, such as the National Union of Track Statisticians (NUTS). Many of the athletes below also competed at the 1993 AAA Championships.

Hammer thrower Paul Head and discus thrower Jackie McKernan each won their fifth straight UK title. Linford Christie (100 m) and Paul Edwards (shot put) made it four consecutive wins in their events. Mick Hill repeated as javelin champion to win his fifth UK title overall. Myrtle Augee (shot put), Gowry Retchakan (400 m hurdles) and Debbie Marti (high jump) all defended their women's titles. Runners Curtis Robb and Phylis Smith returned as UK champions, but at longer distances than they won at in 1992.

The main international track and field competition for the United Kingdom that year was the 1993 World Championships in Athletics. Linford Christie added a world title to his UK and Olympic ones, while UK 100 m runner-up took gold in his hurdles speciality in Stuttgart. UK 200 m champion John Regis was runner-up at global level and Jonathan Edwards (triple jump) and Mick Hill (javelin throw) managed World Championships bronze.

Medal summary

Men

Women

References

UK Athletics Championships
UK Outdoor Championships
Athletics Outdoor
UK Athletics Championships
Sport in Bedford
Sports competitions in London
Athletics competitions in England